Loodhifa is a 2011 Maldivian crime tragedy drama film written and directed by Moomin Fuad. Produced by Hussain Nooradeen under Noor N Movies, the film stars an ensemble cast including Ismail Rasheed, Mohamed Rasheed, Ravee Farooq, Mariyam Afeefa and Fathimath Azifa in pivotal roles. The film was released on 13 February 2011. The film deals with current social issues in the society told from different perspectives of the characters. Prior to release, the film is marketed to be one of the most bold and risky movies released in the industry.

Cast 
 Mohamed Rasheed as Mohamed Jaleel
 Mariyam Shakeela as Zahira
 Ismail Rasheed as Nashid
 Khadheeja Ibrahim Didi as Afiya
 Ravee Farooq as Imran
 Mariyam Afeefa as Sherin
 Ahmed Asim as Azeem
 Fathimath Azifa as Areeka
 Ali Waheed as Amjad
 Ahmed Shiham as Shaante
 Ahmed Saeed as Junaid
 Fathimath Nashfa as Shifza
 Hussain Munawwar as Thomas
 Mariyam Nisha as Shaira
 Fauziyya Hassan
 Neena Saleem as Aishath
 Naashidha Mohamed as Zuley
 Nadhiya Hassan as Minna
 Ahmed Fizam as Suja
 Nashidha Mohamed as Fazu
 Arifa Ibrahim as Saudhiyya
 Aminath Shareef as Faheema
 Ali Shameel as Saleem
 Amira Ismail as Fathimath
 Lufshan Shakeeb as Sappe
 Ahmed Ziya as Jinatte

Soundtrack

Release and reception
The film was released on 13 February 2011. Upon release, the film received widespread critical acclaim. A review from the Sun praised the performance of cast and the film's "realism" in its language, characters and their attitude. Saluting the production team for making this attempt, they wrote: "Loodhifa is a very realistic bold movie which represents the dark side of our community today taking a good advantage of the concept". However, it was criticised for its length; "some scenes can be easily cut off. Beside the editing, there is nothing imperfect about the film to be noted".

Accolades

References

2011 films
Maldivian drama films
Films directed by Moomin Fuad
2011 drama films
Dhivehi-language films